Furious 5 or variation may refer to:

 Grandmaster Flash and the Furious Five, a hip hop group
 Grandmaster Melle Mel and the Furious Five, an album by a hip hop group of the same name
 The Furious Five (Kung Fu Panda), a group of characters in the Kung Fu Panda franchise
 Secrets of the Furious Five, a film in the Kung Fu Panda franchise
 Fast Five aka Fast & Furious 5, a film in the Fast and Furious franchise